Kim Joy Schofield (born April 16, 1962) is a member of the Georgia House of Representatives representing the 60th district since 2017.

Career 
Schofield holds a bachelor's and master's degree in theology and organizational leadership as well as a doctorate from Oral Roberts University. Schofield is self-employed as a personal development strategist.

Due to her work in health policy under the Obama administration and former Governor Nathan Deal, the Lupus Foundation of America recognized Schofield as a champion for those with lupus. Schofield herself was diagnosed with the disease in the year 2000 and has been an advocate for cures, treatments, and policies to support those afflicted by lupus.

In the Georgia House of Representatives, Schofield serves as a member of the Health & Human Services, Interstate Cooperation, and Small Business Development committees.

Schofield also serves as the chair of the Georgia Council of Lupus Education and Awareness.

References

Living people
Democratic Party members of the Georgia House of Representatives
Women state legislators in Georgia (U.S. state)
People with lupus
Oral Roberts University alumni
21st-century American politicians
21st-century American women politicians
1962 births